Caitlin Elizabeth Baunoch (born July 29, 1993), known professionally as Cait Fairbanks, is an American actress and singer-songwriter. She plays Tessa Porter in the CBS daytime soap opera The Young and the Restless, for which she was nominated for two Daytime Emmy Awards. As a musician, she performs as Cait Fairbanks and Ginesse.

Career 
Fairbanks started performing on stage at the age of eight and has since performed in over 20 professional, regional, and community theatre productions, including the Off-Broadway production of Heathers: The Musical in 2014 (she played Veronica and Heather Duke) and 13 (musical) (she played Lucy).

Fairbanks also played Young Mindy in CSI:NY and Gabby Walsh in Untold Stories of the E.R.. Since 2017, Fairbanks has been playing Tessa Porter, a singer-songwriter, on The Young and The Restless. Portraying Tessa Porter allows Fairbanks to perform her own compositions on the daytime soap opera.

Personal life 
As of 2019, Fairbanks confirmed that she is dating fellow co-star Zach Tinker who portrayed Fenmore Baldwin.

Filmography

Discography 
As Cait Fairbanks:
 Digging My Own Grave – single (2016)
 Fight or Flight – single (2017)
 With Me – single (2017)
 Joy to the World – single (2017)
 How Could a Lie Feel So True – single (2018)
 When I See You – single (2019)
 Clear My Mind - single (2019)
 Umbrella (Live) [Unplugged] – single (2019)
 Love Me – single (2019)
 Something in You - single (2019)
 If You're not Busy - single (2019)
 More Than a Vow - single (2020)
 Milky Way (Feat. RC Cates) - single (2021)
 Everytime - single (2022)
 Silver Line - single (2022)

As Ginesse:
 Bedford – single (2018)
 Noise – single (2019)
 The Inbetween – single (2019)
 Somewhere to Die - EP (2020)
 Gatorade - single (2021)

References

External links

1993 births
Living people
American television actresses
American stage actresses
American women singer-songwriters
21st-century American actresses